Matthew Livingston is the fictional teenage detective who appears in a mystery series geared towards young readers and teenagers.  The books are written by Marco Conelli, a retired detective in the NYPD and a literary award-winning author.

Matthew Livingston (fictional teen-detective)

Premise

Matthew Livingston first appeared in 2007 in his first mystery, Matthew Livingston and the Prison of Souls. Although young adult appropriate, the Matthew Livingston books feature hard criminals, murderers, cults, and terrorists.  The books also have a large following from adult readers. The idea came to Author Marco Conelli when he noticed a dormant section in the young adult mystery genre, populated only by shiny re-releases of Nancy Drew and The Hardy Boys. Marco has noted since his first release, popular crime novelists have invaded the genre.

Matthew, age 17 and a high school senior, is an extreme loner and is more interested in studying chemistry and human behavior than indulging in a social life. He possesses remarkable ability in lateral thinking and heightened powers of observation, due to much dedication in the study of both.  The mysteries are not solicited by Matthew for solving rather brought to him (against his wishes) by schoolmate Dennis Sommers.

The first person narration in the novels belongs to Dennis Sommers, age 16, aspiring journalist at Serling High School.  Dennis is self described as the "low man on the totem pole" as a writer for the school newspaper.  Dennis is described as insecure, slightly overweight, and an admitted coward.  His skills include all facets of computers and the programming of them and a deep interest in writing, he admits to keeping journals of his adventures with Matthew Livingston.

Sandra Small rounds out the trio.  Also age 17 (like Matthew) and a high school senior at Serling High School, Sandra is described as attractive with red hair, emerald green eyes, and wire rimmed glasses. She is the experienced member of the group in problem solving.  Sandra drives a red manual transmission Ford Mustang and is an extremely loyal friend with a sense of maturity that goes beyond a usual high school mentality.  She has proven to be extremely aggressive in physical confrontations.

Comparisons

The first person narration supplied by Dennis Sommers has been compared to that of Dr. John Watson, the narrator of the Sherlock Holmes mysteries.  The character of Matthew Livingston is only seen through the eyes of Dennis Sommers.  The comical description of Matthew has been compared to the way Archie Goodwin narrates the Nero Wolfe mysteries.

The Matthew Livingston series was initially described as an "updated version of the Hardy Boys" by many critics.  Author Marco Conelli indicated at many book signings and speaking engagements that he installs a lot of believability and accountability into his stories,  therefore a huge difference between his characters and Frank and Joe Hardy is that the average teenager doesn't own or pilot a speed boat, own and fly their own aircraft, or disappear to other countries to solve crimes.  The Matthew Livingston characters also come equipped with teenage flaws unlike the Hardy Boys.  Dennis Sommers is not content with his look, is down about being somewhat chubby, and is constantly aware that he is a year younger than Matthew and Sandra. Also where the Hardy's could unbelievably be absent from school for lengths of time while they travel on a case, Matthew and friends are always seen at their high school where they meet before first period class and sometimes during the school day. The cases also originate from something discovered by Dennis during one of his school journalism assignments.

The crimes the group becomes involved in are matters that concern their home town, which is unmentioned as of the current writing.  Some readers speculate that it is a suburb of New York City because the author grew up in Queens Village. Adult readers, familiar with adult crime novels, believe that the two Detectives the teens run up against are in fact New York City Detectives, based on their mannerisms and methods.

Titles

Matthew Livingston and the Prison of Souls
Released in April 2007 by The May Davenport Publishing Company introduces the reader to Matthew, Dennis, and Sandra and follows a plot where they unravel a diabolical crime taking place in their town.

Matthew Livingston and the Prison of Souls -2008 Re-release
An unedited version that gets a little bit more indepth into description and mentions the make of Sandra's car.

Matthew Livingston and the Millionaire Murder
Released in March 2009, a fabulously received mystery that the Midwest Book Review described as "highly recommended reading for young adults who appreciate a well crafted and original work of mystery and suspense." The last page in this book is titled Blogging With Dennis Sommers. It serves as an education piece speaking about some of the deduction that Matthew does in the book. This idea might have been aimed at an education program but was not revisited in the following book. Also Book 2 is the only book containing titles for each chapter.

Matthew Livingston and the Politics of Death-2010
"A highly enticing story. "Matthew Livingston and the Politics of Death" is not to be missed, highly recommended. - Midwest Book Review
"A modern successor to the Baker Street Irregulars, the youthful sidekicks of Sherlock Holmes."
-EJ Wagner, Edgar Award-Winning Author of The Science of Sherlock Holmes

Happenings

Author Marco Conelli has made many appearances in schools, libraries, book stores, and special events. He has made his books available to school programs where classrooms were in need of books and others where there was no funding for books.

On April 13, 2010, Novelist Mary Higgins Clark released her novel "The Shadow of Your Smile" and thanked Marco in her acknowledgements section.  Marco has in the past(anonoymously)advised many authors in police procedure.

In October 2010 Marco Conelli released Matthew Livingston and the Politics of Death, book 3 in this series. The book was very well received and tackles a suspenseful plot as Matthew draws more into the cerebral process of a Zodiac Killer type of assassin who is not only stalking victims, is stalking Matthew, Dennis, and Sandra as well.

In August 2011 Matthew Livingston and the Politics of Death won the Silver Falchion Award at Killer Nashville. The book competed against mysteries from every genre, not just young adult to win the award for best 2011 mystery novel.

In January 2012, The New Mexico Journal of Reading published an article by Marco Conelli titled, "Matthew Livingston and the Power of Literacy". The article is an optimistic look at some of the concerns of young Americans and their attitude toward fundamental reading/writing skills.

In July 2012, Crime Spree Magazine published an article by Marco Conelli titled "Perps & Guns- It's No Mystery". The article is a detailed account of criminals who carry firearms and the basis/necessity for them in crime fiction.

In October 2013, Marco Conelli was featured in Sherlock Holmes- The International Exhibition. An enlightening adventure into forensic science, the touring exhibition, which goes international in 2017, takes visitors from 1890s Victorian London to the crime fighters who have adapted Holmes' methods today. Marco's deduction facts lifted from his real life experiences and inserted into the Matthew Livingston books will be talked about in a video segment in the exhibit.

In January 2015, Marco Conelli's short story 'Borders of Morality' was featured in the Crime Fiction Anthology 10 Code 10-CODE is the first-ever anthology of stories written by 10 real-life cops honoring officers killed in the line of duty. Proceeds from the sale of 10-CODE will benefit the National Law Enforcement Officers Memorial Fund in Washington, DC.'Borders of Morality' is not a Matthew Livingston story as it follows the protagonist James Paul McCormack, a Sergeant in the NYPD's Bronx Homicide Squad. This is a departure for Marco from the Young Adult thriller, as 'Borders of Morality' falls in the adult crime genre.

In December 2016, Marco's first full length, adult crime thriller Cry For Help was released by Endeavour Press (Now Endeavour Media). The book cover is endorsed by former Los Angeles Prosecutor, and prosecutor for the O.J. Simpson trial, Marcia Clark. Cry For Help features two protagonists, one of them being James Paul McCormack who is featured in Borders of Morality. In one of the last chapters of Cry For Help the other protagonist, a retired NYPD detective Caleb Alden is sitting in a coffee shop called The Bean Counter. He is waited on by a girl described as having emerald green eyes behind a pair of wire rimmed glasses. The Bean Counter is where Sandra Small, from the Matthew Livingston series, works. The description is also how Conelli describes the character in the Matthew Livingston novels. This leads readers to believe the characters from both books may eventually meet.

In July 2019,a mystery anthology "After Midnight-Tales From the Graveyard Shift" was released by Level Best Books. With an introduction from Lee Child, the novel collects stories from authors such as Heather Graham, Alison Brennan, and even Joe Bonsal of The Oak Ridge Boys. Marco contributes another James Paul McCormack short story in "Gentrified Homicide". A sequel to the anthology is scheduled for 2020 with rumors of a Matthew Livingston short story being included.

October 2021 saw the release of New York: Give Me your Best or Worst. Marco Conelli & Elizabeth Crowens contribute the dystopian short story Fulton Street Farewell to this anthology of authors and photography. A definite coffee table book, the pairing of New York images and clever stories begins with the forward by Reed Farrell Coleman.

External links

 Official Website of Marco Conelli
 Amazon.com link

Fictional amateur detectives
Characters in children's literature
Matthew Livingston
Matthew Livingston
Series of children's books
2000s children's books